Marie-Hélène Mathieu (born  4 July 1929) is a French disability rights activist. She is co-founder of the international movement Faith and Light; with Jean Vanier, she has dedicated her life’s work to people with disabilities and to their families and friends.

Through her testimonies, Marie-Hélène Mathieu continues to be involved in the lives of these support structures that she has created, in order to ensure that the person with a disability, irrespective of the severity, finds their unique, rightful place in society.

Biography 
Mathieu was born in Tournus, Saône-et-Loire.

He was one of the few priests to consider the question of religious education for young people suffering from a mental disability, and went so far as to develop a new catechism for them. At the end of her course, Father Henri asked her to work with him, a collaboration that would last for around twenty years.

In 1956, Mathieu was elected President of the French Christian Association of special needs teachers, for whom she founded the magazine  ("Special Needs Teachers").

In 1957, during a retreat at Chateauneuf de Galaure (in the Drôme region of France), where Father Finet was preaching, she met Marthe Robin, founder of the Foyers de Charité. Robin, who was paralysed and practically blind, was very close to children with disabilities and their families.

In 1963 Mathieu founded the OCH. The association aims to support families, encourage a response to their distress and offer them new hope, particularly through the introduction of a permanent place of welcome and financial support for Christian associations and establishments.

In 1968, alongside the lectures and meetings, Marie-Hélène Mathieu created Ombres et Lumière (Shadows and Light), the OCH magazine aimed at people with disabilities, their families and friends.

That same year, faced with the suffering of the parents of two children with serious disabilities who had felt marginalised at Lourdes, she launched a remarkable pilgrimage to Lourdes with Jean Vanier for people with mental disabilities and their families and friends. At Easter 1971, this pilgrimage gathered together 12,000 people from 15 countries, including 400 people with a mental disability. From this extraordinary gathering the international movement of Faith and Light was born, a movement which today numbers more than 1,508 communities in 80 countries.

In addition to OCH and Faith and Light, Mathieu was involved in creating the Simon de Cyrène Foundation for people who have suffered a severe head injury. She is also one of the founders of Relais Lumière Espérance, which is aimed at close friends and relatives of people suffering from mental illness, as well as the Groupe de liaison Saint Joseph, which twice a year brings together around twenty organisations working to found and support Christian homes for adults with mental disabilities. In the same spirit, the Pierre-François Jamet working and communion group, which she launched with Xavier Le Pichon , enables around thirty small communities to meet, and supports them in their care for people suffering from psychological distress.

Mathieu was appointed by Pope John-Paul II to the Pontifical Council for the Laity (1984 – 1989) and as expert for the Holy See at the Council of Europe. She is the first woman to have given a Lent address at Notre Dame Cathedral in Paris (in 1988). Pope Benedict XVI appointed her auditor to the synod on the Eucharist (2005).

Quote

Positions

Founder 
1963: Founded the Christian foundation for disabled people, of which she was Director until 1996. 
1968: Founded the magazine Ombres et Lumière in 1968, a Christian magazine for people with disabilities, their families and friends. She held the editorship of this until 2000, and still writes a bi-monthly column. 
1971: Founded the international Faith and Light movement with Jean Vanier, communities where people with a mental disability, their families and friends can meet. She coordinated the movement until 1990. Today, Faith and Light is present in 80 countries and has more than 50,000 members.
1972: Started the permanent reception service at Lourdes.
1982: Founded the  friendship and prayer group (together with Secours Catholique), now known as Relais Lumière Espérance.
1992: Founded the Pierre-François Jamet Communion and working group, with Xavier Le Pichon  
2006: Founded the Simon de Cyrène Foundation.

The current Director of the OCH is Philippe de Lachapelle. Cyril Douillet is Editor of Ombres et Lumière, and Ghislain du Chéné is International Coordinator of the Faith and Light movement.

Administrator 
1956 – 1973: Secretary-General of the medico-pedagogical and psychosocial committee of the International Catholic Child Bureau (BICE)
1956 – 1971: President of the French National Catholic Union of Youth Special Needs Teachers (UNAEDE)
1972 – 1975: Vice-coordinator of L'Arche
1979 – 1986: Administrator of Secours Catholique
1986 – 1983: Administrator of Radio Notre-Dame

Church 
1984: Member of the Pontifical Council for the Laity, appointed by John Paul II.
1988: First woman to give an Easter address at Notre-Dame Cathedral, Paris. 
2001 – 2004: Expert for the Holy See on the subject of people with disabilities at the Council of Europe. 
2005: Auditor at the Synod of Bishops on the Eucharist, appointed by Pope Benedict XVI. She requested that even the most profoundly disabled people be permitted to receive the Eucharist in accordance with the faith of their family or community that accompanies them.

Publications 
 Regular columns in the  magazine since its creation in 1968.

Publications

DVDs
The story of Faith and Light (2006)
  ("A voice for the voiceless") (2010)

Honours and awards 
2008: Commander of the Legion of Honour.
2005:  (Papal Medal)
2003: Award from the French National Academy of Education and Social Studies
1976: Knight of the National Order of Merit (France)

See also 
 Jean Vanier

References

External links 
   Foi et Lumière official website
   KTO official website
   Mathieu at the OCH official website
   Groupe de liaison Saint Joseph at the OCH official website
   Foi et Lumière at the Jean Vanier official website
   Ombres et Lumière magazine
   Relais Lumière Espérance website
   Simon de Cyrène Foundation official website
   Plon official website
   Relais Lumière Espérance official website

Living people
1929 births
People from Tournus
French disability rights activists